Phrynoponera transversa has been discovered and described by Bolton, B. & Fisher, B. L. in 2008.

References

External links

Ponerinae
Insects described in 2008
Hymenoptera of Africa